Lentibacillus saliphilus is a moderately halophilic bacterium from the genus of Lentibacillus.

References

Bacillaceae
Bacteria described in 2021